This is a list of zoos in India. For a list of aquaria, see List of aquaria in India.

Zoos are primarily dry facilities where animals are confined within enclosures and displayed to the public, and in which they may also be bred. Such facilities include zoos, safari parks, animal theme parks, aviaries, butterfly zoos, and reptile centres, as well as wildlife sanctuaries and nature reserves where visitors are allowed.

The oldest zoo in India is Arignar Anna Zoo, Chennai.. The zoo and park was opened in 1855.

The Central Zoo Authority of India (CZA) is the Governing Authority of all Zoos in India, and is an associate member of the World Association of Zoos and Aquariums (WAZA).

Zoos in India

Under construction 

 Jambu Zoo in Jammu
Thrissur Zoological Park Wildlife Conversation & Research Centre in Kerala

See also

 List of botanical gardens in India
 List of zoos
 List of national parks of India
 Wildlife sanctuaries of India

Notes

References

External links

Official website of: "Central Zoo Authority of India" (CZA), Government of India
THE INDIAN ZOO INQUIRY  A Review of Conditions in the Zoos of India, Compassionate Crusaders Trust & Zoocheck Canada, 2004 (Revised 2006)

 
Zoos
Zoos
India